James Burton "J.B." Mauney (born January 9, 1987) is an American professional rodeo cowboy who specializes in bull riding. The bulk of his career came from riding in the Professional Bull Riders (PBR), winning the world championship for said organization in 2013 and 2015. Since 2021, he has competed full-time in the Professional Rodeo Cowboys Association (PRCA). He also competed briefly in the now-defunct Championship Bull Riding (CBR) circuit. Mauney is considered one of the greatest bull riders of his generation.

Early life 
J.B. Mauney was born James Burton Mauney in Charlotte, North Carolina, on January 9, 1987. He joined the PBR in 2005 and the PRCA in 2009.

Career 
Mauney is one of only two bull riders to stay on Bushwacker for the full 8 seconds on the Built Ford Tough Series (BFTS), the elite series of the PBR (for a score of 95.25 points in Tulsa, Oklahoma, in August 2013), and one of three bull riders to stay on Bushwacker for the full 8 seconds during the bull's career.  He is also one of only five riders to get a qualified ride on Asteroid which he accomplished on the BFTS in San Antonio, Texas, in August 2012, for a score of 93.50 points. Asteroid, the 2012 World Champion bull, earned a high score of 46.25 points.

Mauney competed the first several years of his professional career with a helmet. However, by 2013, he was riding with a cowboy hat. On November 5, 2016, Mauney made PBR history by being the first bull rider to reach the $7 million mark in career earnings.

In 2017, Mauney suffered a significant injury to his right arm, requiring surgery to install a screw and 13 anchors. Mauney's career has been plagued with many injuries, but he has continued to pursue professional bull riding history.

"It's part of being a cowboy", he stated in an interview with Monster Energy, "when you crawl in to a chute, nothing else matters. You tie your hand and you don't give up until you hit the dirt". In 2019, Mauney tied another two time world champion Justin McBride for the most televised wins within the 26 year history of the PBR.  In an interview for the PBR, Mauney said "What gets me is when people who don't ride bulls for a living try to tell me when it's time to hang it up".

Mauney joined the PBR in 2005 and won the PBR World Championship title twice, in 2013 and 2015. He also won the PBR World Finals event twice, in 2009 and 2013. In his first year of competition, he won the Rookie of the Year in 2006. He qualified for the PBR World Finals 15 times in his career (2006 to 2020).

Since 2020, Mauney has been part owner of Ultimate Bullfighters (UBF), an American freestyle bullfighting organization.

After struggling to find success during the first few events of the 2021 PBR season, Mauney decided to try his luck in the PRCA. Although he joined the PRCA in 2009, he only competed sporadically at PRCA events from 2009 to 2020. In July 2021, Mauney announced that he would step away from riding in the PBR to focus solely on riding in the PRCA and qualifying for his first-ever National Finals Rodeo (NFR). He qualified for and competed at his first NFR in December of that year.

Legacy 
The PBR and the fans consider Mauney a legend due to his records and accomplishments. In January 2018, he became the third bull rider to reach 500 rides on the elite series when he rode All The Way Up for 87.25 points during Round 1 of the Monster Energy Buck Off at Madison Square Garden in January 2018. In addition to his world championships, he has numerous event wins and is close to breaking the record for 90-point rides. He has won more money than any other bull rider, over $7 million. He has also successfully ridden all of the active PBR World Champion Bulls during his career, except Mossy Oak Mudslinger, Smooth Operator and Woopaa.

Mauney is known for picking the rankest bull when there's a draw, especially in the championship round of most events. He and three-time world champion bull Bushwacker are known for being matched up 13 times. Mauney always picked Bushwacker in the elite rounds. Bushwacker never bucked in any rounds that weren't elite once he entered the BFTS. Mauney said, "If you are going to be the best, you've got to ride the best."

Fellow two-time PBR world champion Justin McBride said "he is in a class of his own, the best bull rider of his generation. As soon as the day he decides to be done he is headed straight to the Ring of Honor...he will forever be in the conversation as the greatest the PBR has ever seen".

Personal life 
Mauney was married to Lexie Wiggly from 2012 to 2015. In 2016, he married Samantha Lyne. On January 23, 2019, Mauney and his wife Samantha welcomed the birth of their first son. Mauney also has a daughter (born 2011), from a previous relationship. Until as recently as 2019, Mauney and his family lived in Mooresville, North Carolina, where Mauney had spent most of his life. They then lived in Cotulla, Texas for a few years. In late 2020, Mauney purchased a property in Stephenville, Texas and in early 2022, he and his family relocated there.

References

Other sources
 

1987 births
Living people
People from Mooresville, North Carolina
Sportspeople from North Carolina
Bull riders